Boatner is a surname. Notable people with the surname include:

Bryant L. Boatner (1907-1986), United States Air Force Lieutenant general
Charles J. Boatner (1849–1903), American politician
Edward Boatner (1898–1981), American composer
Haydon L. Boatner (1900–1977), United States Army Major general
Joseph Boatner (1918—1989), American singer
Mack Boatner (born 1958), American football player
Mark M. Boatner III (1921–2006), American soldier, historian, and author

See also
Boatner House